

William Bullen was a leading English cricketer throughout the last quarter of the 18th century, his known career spanning the years 1773 to 1800. He was an all-rounder who probably batted right-handed. He played mainly for Kent sides although he also appeared for England XIs and a variety of other sides.

Arthur Haygarth, writing in the 1860s, describes Bullen as a "close set, strong built man" and a "crack" (i.e. expert) player, who was a "renowned batsman and bowler". He was a fast bowler, in the underarm style, and a hard-hitting batsman who was a "powerful" player. He is reputed to have "frequently bowled the sixth part of a mile (about 300 yards), or the whole length of the Artillery Ground in London". He was possibly a native of Deptford in Kent and is known to have played for Dartford Cricket Club as well as teams organised by landowners from the western parts of the county.

Bullen is known to have played in 113 matches retrospectively recognised as first-class. In these matches, Bullen totalled 1,777 runs with a highest score of 54, his only half-century. He held 119 catches and is credited with 181 wickets. His best known performance was six wickets in an innings.

Bullen played in nearly every season from 1773 to 1800. The first match he is known to have played in was for an England XI against a Hampshire side on the Artillery Ground in July 1773. He batted in both the England innings, scoring 1 in each. In July 1774, playing again for England against Hampshire at Sevenoaks Vine, he took five wickets in Hampshire's first innings, the earliest recorded instance of a bowler taking five wickets in an innings. He played for Kent sides from 1774, including matches against Maidstone teams in 1777, and his final known matches were in four odds matches for Kent sides against England teams in 1800.

Notes

References

Sources
 Derek Birley (1999) A Social History of English Cricket. London: Aurum Press. 
 Derek Carlaw (2020) Kent County Cricketers A to Z. Part One: 1806–1914 (revised edition). (Available online at The Association of Cricket Statisticians and Historians. Retrieved 2020-12-21.)
 Arthur Haygarth (1862) Scores & Biographies, Vol. I (1744–1826). Lillywhite.
 H. T. Waghorn (1906) The Dawn of Cricket. Electric Press.

External links
 

Year of birth unknown
Year of death unknown
English cricketers
English cricketers of 1701 to 1786
English cricketers of 1787 to 1825
Gentlemen of Kent cricketers
Hampshire cricketers
Kent cricketers
Left-Handed v Right-Handed cricketers
Non-international England cricketers
Old Etonians cricketers
R. Leigh's XI cricketers
West Kent cricketers